Leptenchelys vermiformis, or the slender worm-eel, is a species of eel in the family Ophichthidae. It is the only member of its genus. It is found only in the Pacific Ocean in the vicinity of Costa Rica.

References

Ophichthidae
Monotypic fish genera
Fish described in 1941